Home Farm is a suburb of Bracknell, in Berkshire, England.

It was developed on the site of a small farm on the edge of Great Hollands,  near to the Downshire golf course and King's Academy Easthampstead Park. The estate consists of 330 dwellings, with a number of two, three and four bedroomed terraced houses, together with several blocks of flats.

Home Farm was built in the mid-1970s by a private developer, but the project stopped when the developer ran out of money. The site was taken over by Bracknell Council, and the houses used for social housing. Following the 'Right to buy' legislation, about 50% of the homes are now in private ownership. It differs from the rest of Great Hollands in that traffic segregation has not been included in the plan. By road, the housing estate is accessible via Ringmead (the Great Hollands ring road).

Bracknell